The National Unity Party is a political party in Malawi. 
In the last general elections, (20 May 2004), the party was part of the Mgwirizano Coalition, that won 27 out of 194 seats.

Political parties in Malawi